The monument of Shah Rukn al-Din dates back to the 12th century AD, and in Dezful, Shah Rokn al-Din district, the center of the neighborhood is located and this work was registered on June 2, 1356 with the number 1377 as one of the national works of Iran.

Everything about the tomb 
This tomb is located in Dezful district of Shah Rukn al-Din on Taleghani Street, Shahid Dianti Alley near Shah Rokn-e-Din's shrine. The tomb of this tomb is Niligan and conical with fourteen sides. At the top of the south door there is a staircase, a duct and a canopy that is built on top of the two castles. The complex includes a shrine, a mosque, a school and a bathroom, and it is also noted that the castle buildings were built during the Qajar period and the tombstones and domes are related to the Timurid period during the reign of Shahrokh Mirza, son of Amir Timur.

Gallery

See also 
Cultural Heritage, Handicrafts and Tourism Organization of Iran

Bath of Shah Rokn al-Din

References

External links 



National works of Iran